The Online Film Critics Society Award for Best Original Score is an annual film award given by the Online Film Critics Society to honor the best original score of the year.

Winners

1990s

2000s

2010s

2020s

See also

References

Film awards for best score